Pistol is a British biographical drama miniseries created by Craig Pearce for FX that follows Sex Pistols guitarist Steve Jones and the band's rise to prominence and notoriety. The series was announced in January 2021, and was directed by Danny Boyle. It premiered on Hulu on 31 May 2022.

Premise
The six-part series follows Sex Pistols guitarist Steve Jones and the band's rise to prominence and notoriety.

Cast

Main

Recurring

Episodes

Production
The series, created by Craig Pearce, was given a six-episode order from FX in January 2021, with Danny Boyle directing all six episodes. Toby Wallace was cast to play Jones, with Maisie Williams among the supporting cast. Thomas Brodie-Sangster, Talulah Riley and Iris Law would join in March as filming began. Production occurred in Hemel Hempstead, Folkestone (and nearby village of Sandgate), Dover, Deal and London.

The limited series premiered with all six episodes on Hulu on 31 May 2022, and Disney+ (Star) in the UK, Ireland, Canada, Australia, New Zealand and Singapore. The limited series is also planned for Star+ in South America and Disney+ (Star) in all other territories.

The concert footage and musical scenes were recorded live, without overdubbing or studio effects and the actors portraying the Sex Pistols and Chrissie Hynde played the instruments and performed their own vocals. Since they were neophytes (Slater (Cook) had experience fronting bands but not drumming), they had to quickly become proficient.

Wallace (Jones), Slater (Cook) and Chandler (Hynde) had the benefit of meeting with their counterparts. Boon could not meet with Rotten due to the latter's disavowal of the project but he closely studied Rotten's stage presence to replicate it and read the books authored by Rotten. Jones also met with creator and writer Pearce to answer questions and provide his input. Cook was involved in the series, and gave his input as needed.

Production designer Kave Quinn studied Julien Temple's documentary The Filth and the Fury as well as Andrew Marr's BBC docuseries The Making of Modern Britain to portray London as it was in the 1970s.

Esquire magazine said that "the commitment to the punk ethos of the Sex Pistols comes through in the making of the film itself." Director Boyle would let the actors run through scenes and entire performances, not using a traditional shot list. He matched the energy of punk by using cinema techniques such as split-screen editing, flashbacks, archival footage, freeze-frames, gaudy dreamscapes and slow-motion.

Legal case over music rights
In 2021, while the series was still in production, Sex Pistols frontman John Lydon criticized the series, branding it as "The most disrespectful shit I've ever had to endure". Former bandmates Steve Jones and Paul Cook sued Lydon to allow Sex Pistols music to be used in the series despite Lydon's objections. They said they had the support of Glen Matlock, the estate of Sid Vicious, and cited a 1998 agreement that allowed a majority decision among band members. Lydon lost the legal battle that August.

Reception

Critical response
On review aggregator website Rotten Tomatoes, the series holds a 54% approval rating based on 24 critic reviews, with an average rating of 6.1/10. The website's critics consensus reads, "Danny Boyle's frenzied direction brings plenty of energy to this punk biography, but the rote conventions of a band's rise and fall make Pistol something of a misfire." On Metacritic, the series has a score of 59 out of 100, based on 23 critics, indicating "mixed or average reviews".

Angie Han from Hollywood Reporter wrote positively that "Pistol does do better than some in breathing a bit of life into that formula, first and foremost through a pair of exceptional performances...by Anson Boon, the intense 22-year old playing front man Johnny Rotten. If John is its [the show's] soul, Malcolm McClaren is its calculating brain. As played by Thomas Brodie-Sanger, he's a Svengali so relentlessly charming, that...[he] turns manipulation into an art form itself."

Empires Beth Webb felt that "the performances vary in strength - but the collective scrappy energy of the ensemble under the director's guidance is undeniable."

NMEs El Hunt gave a mixed review: "Pistol could've gone further - as much as it explores the pitfalls of rock'n'roll mythology, it occasionally falls into the very same trappings that it tries to scrutinize. But, taken at face value, this is a high-energy and creatively pieced-together look back on how punk rock, with Sex Pistols at the vanguard, swept the UK and beyond.

Jim Sullivan of Book and Film Globe wrote that "there's a verisimilitude here. Most of the time, you can suspend disbelief and feel like you're in on the scheme, observing the band as they stumble, scrap and score. There was a cartoonish element to the Pistols. But there's a richness and complexity to them as well and Boyle mines that. Boyle puts the Pistols at the forefront of the punk movement and I've got no quarrel with that, but he fails, by and large, to place them into the larger context of the punk explosion happening all around England: The Clash, The Jam, The Damned, many more. Yes, you get the sense that there's a wave of punk rock going on, but the Pistols seem insular and far more isolated from it than they were in reality.

Madison Bloom from Pitchfork was negative: "Pistols script is full of grand manifestos and pep talks that turn flashes of rebellion into rote history lessons ... the screenwriter seems petrified that the audience will miss something...certain phrases are repeated to a comical degree...Boyle commits the same crime of over-explaining... With its ham-fisted dialogue and gaudy editing, the new FX/Hulu show Pistol offers a sanitized kind of anarchy."

Deadline Hollywoods Dominic Patter asserted that "Even with sneering classics like "God Save the Queen" in the well-crafted soundtrack mix...[the film] limps along when it should roar ... [it] gets jammed up in the contradictions of the Sex Pistols where it could have reveled in them with revolutionary enthusiasm and clear eyes."

References

External links
  – official site (US)
  – official site (ROW)
 

2022 American television series debuts
2022 British television series debuts
2022 American television series endings
2022 British television series endings
2020s American television miniseries
2020s British television miniseries
FX Networks original programming
Cultural depictions of the Sex Pistols
English-language television shows
American biographical series
Television series based on singers and musicians
Star (Disney+) original programming